The WWE Raw guest star is a concept which involves a current or former WWE performer, mainstream celebrity or, sports personality making a guest appearance, assuming the on-screen role as a guest star for that particular episode. The guest star also often participates in backstage vignettes with members of the WWE roster.

The concept was introduced on the June 15, 2009 episode of WWE Raw by Donald Trump, who at the time was involved in an angle where he was the owner of the Raw franchise. On June 22, after having regained ownership of Raw, WWE Chairman Vince McMahon announced that Trump's initiative would go into effect on June 29, with the first star being Batista. For almost a year, Raw featured a guest star each week except for the week of April 26, 2010 episode, which featured the 2010 WWE Draft. As of June 14, 2010, WWE decided to slowly phase out the guest star concept on Raw, by only scheduling guest stars every other week, with the possibility of having a guest star only when needed.

Guest hosts differ from guest stars in that they have the power of a Raw brand General Manager. On May 10, 2010 it was announced that all future guest stars would no longer have that power in a decision made by the Raw general manager Vickie Guerrero who later quit the role that night. The guest host position was renamed to guest star, and the general manager position returned. In November 2014, the guest host position returned after a 3-year hiatus.

Since the WWE Raw guest star concept was established there have been 73 episodes that have featured 92 stars.

Guest host history

Guest star history

References
General

Specific

External links
WWE Raw at WWE.com
WWE Raw at USANetwork.com
Raw guest host one-year anniversary

Guest stars
Raw guest stars

es:WWE Raw Supershow#Guest stars